This is a list of the described species of Ricinulei (hooded tickspiders). The data is taken from the World Ricinulei Catalog.

Ricinoididae

 Cryptocellus Westwood, 1874
 Cryptocellus abaporu Bonaldo & Pinto-da-Rocha, 2003 — Brazil
 Cryptocellus adisi Platnick, 1988 — Brazil
 Cryptocellus albosquamatus Cooke, 1967 — Guyana
 Cryptocellus becki Platnick & Shadab, 1977 — Brazil
 Cryptocellus bocas Platnick & Shadab, 1981 — Panama
 Cryptocellus bordoni (Dumitresco & Juvara-balş, 1977) — Venezuela
 Cryptocellus brignolii Cokendolpher, 2000 — Suriname
 Cryptocellus centralis Fage, 1921 — Costa Rica
 Cryptocellus chimaera Botero-Trujillo & Valdez-Mondragón, 2016 – Ecuador
 Cryptocellus chiriqui Platnick & Shadab, 1981 — Costa Rica, Panama
 Cryptocellus conori Tourinho & Saturnino, 2010 — Brazil
 Cryptocellus fagei Cooke & Shadab, 1973 — Costa Rica
 Cryptocellus florezi Platnick & García, 2008 — Colombia
 Cryptocellus foedus Westwood, 1874 — Brazil
 Cryptocellus gamboa Platnick & Shadab, 1981 — Panama
 Cryptocellus glenoides Cooke & Shadab, 1973 — Colombia
 Cryptocellus goodnighti Platnick & Shadab, 1981 — Costa Rica
 Cryptocellus hanseni Cooke & Shadab, 1973 — Honduras, Nicaragua
 Cryptocellus iaci Tourinho, Man-Hung & Bonaldo, 2010 — Brazil
 Cryptocellus icamiabas Tourinho & de Azevedo, 2007 — Brazil
 Cryptocellus isthmius Cooke & Shadab, 1973 — Panama
 Cryptocellus lampeli Cooke, 1967 — Guyana
 Cryptocellus lisbethae González-Sponga, 1998 — Venezuela
 Cryptocellus luisedieri Botero-Trujillo & Pérez, 2009 — Colombia
 Cryptocellus magnus Ewing, 1929 — Colombia
 Cryptocellus muiraquitan Tourinho, Lo-Man-Hung & Salvatierra, 2014 — Brazil
 Cryptocellus narino Platnick & Paz, 1979 — Colombia
 Cryptocellus osa Platnick & Shadab, 1981 — Costa Rica
 Cryptocellus peckorum Platnick & Shadab, 1977 — Colombia
 Cryptocellus platnicki Botero-Trujillo & Pérez, 2008 — Colombia
 Cryptocellus pseudocellatus Roewer, 1952 — Peru
 Cryptocellus simonis Hansen & Sørensen, 1904 — Brazil
 Cryptocellus sofiae Botero-Trujillo, 2014 — Colombia
 Cryptocellus striatipes Cooke & Shadab, 1973 — Costa Rica
 Cryptocellus tarsilae Pinto-da-Rocha & Bonaldo, 2007 — Brazil
 Cryptocellus verde Platnick & Shadab, 1981 — Costa Rica
 Cryptocellus whitticki Platnick & Shadab, 1977 — Guyana

 Pseudocellus Platnick, 1980
 Pseudocellus abeli Armas, 2017 — Cuba
 Pseudocellus alux Armas & Agreda, 2016 — Guatemala
 Pseudocellus barberi (Ewing, 1929) — Guatemala, Honduras (nomen dubium)
 Pseudocellus blesti (Merrett, 1960) — Panama
 Pseudocellus bolivari Gertsch, 1971 — Mexico
 Pseudocellus boneti (Bolívar y Pieltain, 1942) — Mexico
 Pseudocellus chankin Valdez-Mondragón & Francke, 2011 — Mexico
 Pseudocellus cookei (Gertsch, 1977) — Guatemala
 Pseudocellus cruzlopezi Valdez-Mondragón & Francke, 2013 — Mexico
 Pseudocellus cubanicus (Dumitresco & Juvara-balş, 1973) — Cuba
 Pseudocellus dissimulans (Cooke & Shadab, 1973) — El Salvador
 Pseudocellus dorotheae (Gertsch & Mulaik, 1939) — US
 Pseudocellus gertschi (Márquez & Conconi, 1974) — Mexico
 Pseudocellus ignotus Armas, 2017 — Cuba
 Pseudocellus jarocho Valdez-Mondragón & Francke, 2011 — Mexico
 Pseudocellus krejcae Cokendolpher & Enríquez, 2004 — Belize
 Pseudocellus mayari (Armas, 1977) — Cuba
 Pseudocellus mitchelli Gertsch, 1971 — Mexico
 Pseudocellus monjarazi Valdez-Mondragón & Francke, 2013 — Mexico
 Pseudocellus osorioi (Bolívar y Pieltain, 1946) — Mexico
 Pseudocellus oztotl Valdez-Mondragón & Francke, 2011 — Mexico
 Pseudocellus pachysoma Teruel & Armas, 2008 — Cuba
 Pseudocellus paradoxus (Cooke, 1972) — Cuba
 Pseudocellus pearsei (Chamberlin & Ivie, 1938) — Mexico
 Pseudocellus pelaezi (Coronado Gutierrez, 1970) — Mexico
 Pseudocellus permagnus Armas, 2017 — Cuba
 Pseudocellus platnicki Valdez-Mondragón & Francke, 2011 — Mexico
 Pseudocellus reddelli (Gertsch, 1971) — Mexico
 Pseudocellus relictus (Chamberlin & Ivie, 1938) — Panama
 Pseudocellus sbordonii (Brignoli, 1974) — Mexico
 Pseudocellus seacus Platnick & Pass, 1982 — Guatemala
 Pseudocellus silvai (Armas, 1977) — Cuba
 Pseudocellus spinotibialis (Goodnight & Goodnight, 1952) — Mexico
 Pseudocellus undatus Armas, 2017 — Cuba
 Pseudocellus valerdii Valdez-Mondragón & Juárez-Sánchez, 2021 — Mexico

 Ricinoides Ewing, 1929
 Ricinoides afzelii (Thorell, 1892) – Ghana, Guinea, Sierra Leone
 Ricinoides atewa Naskrecki, 2008 – Ghana
 Ricinoides crassipalpe (Hansen & Sørensen, 1904) – Cameroon, Equatorial Guinea
 Ricinoides feae (Hansen, 1921) – Guinea, Guinea-Bissau
 Ricinoides hanseni Legg, 1976 – Sierra Leone
 Ricinoides karschii (Hansen & Sørensen, 1904) – Cameroon, Congo, Gabon
 Ricinoides leonensis Legg, 1978 – Sierra Leone
 Ricinoides megahanseni Legg, 1982 – Côte d’Ivoire
 Ricinoides olounoua Legg, 1978 – Cameroon
 Ricinoides sjostedtii (Hansen & Sørensen, 1904) – Cameroon, Nigeria
 Ricinoides westermannii (Guérin-Méneville, 1838) – Côte d’Ivoire, Ghana, Togo

Fossil species
While no fossil species of Ricinoididae are known, the other two described families are only known from the Pennsylvanian, about 300 mya.

Curculioididae

 †Amarixys Selden, 1992
 †Amarixys gracilis (Petrunkevitch, 1945)
 †Amarixys stellaris Selden, 1992
 †Amarixys sulcata (Melander, 1903)

 †Curculioides Buckland, 1837
 †Curculioides adompha Brauckmann, 1987
 †Curculioides ansticii Buckland, 1837
 †Curculioides eltringhami Petrunkevitch, 1949
 †Curculioides gigas Selden, 1992
 †Curculioides granulatus Petrunkevitch, 1949
 †Curculioides mcluckiei Selden, 1992
 †Curculioides pococki Selden, 1992
 †Curculioides scaber (Scudder, 1890)

Poliocheridae

 †Poliochera Scudder, 1884
 †Poliochera cretacea Wunderlich, 2012
 †Poliochera gibbsi Selden, 1992
 †Poliochera glabra Petrunkevitch, 1913
 †Poliochera punctulata Scudder, 1884

 †Terpsicroton Selden, 1992
 †Terpsicroton alticeps (Pocock, 1911)

Primoricinuleidae

 †Primoricinuleus Wunderlich, 2015
 †Primoricinuleus pugio Wunderlich, 2015

Sigillaricinuleidae

 †Sigillaricinuleus Wunderlich, 2022
 †Sigillaricinuleus tripares Wunderlich, 2022

References

Ricinulei
Ricinulei